Charles Neil Williams (15 November 1918 – 12 January 1998) was a New Zealand water polo player.

At the 1950 British Empire Games he won the silver medal as part of the men's water polo team.

A retired firefighter, Williams died in Mosgiel on 12 January 1998, and his ashes were buried at Green Park Cemetery.

References

1918 births
1998 deaths
Sportspeople from Dunedin
Commonwealth Games silver medallists for New Zealand
New Zealand male water polo players
Water polo players at the 1950 British Empire Games
Burials at Green Park Cemetery
Commonwealth Games competitors for New Zealand
New Zealand firefighters